George Roche Evans (September 25, 1922 – September 13, 1985) was a Bishop of the Catholic Church in the United States. He served as an auxiliary bishop of the Archdiocese of Denver from 1969 to 1985.

Biography
Born in Denver, Colorado, George Evans was ordained a priest for the Archdiocese of Denver on May 31, 1947.  On February 24, 1969 Pope Paul VI appointed him as the Titular Bishop of Tubyza and Auxiliary Bishop of Denver.  He was ordained a bishop by Archbishop Luigi Raimondi, the Apostolic Delegate to the United States, on April 23, 1969. The principal co-consecrators were Denver Archbishop James Casey and Bishop Hubert Newell of Cheyenne.  Evans continued to serve as an auxiliary bishop until his death on September 13, 1985, at the age of 62.

References

1922 births
1985 deaths
People from Denver
20th-century American Roman Catholic titular bishops
Roman Catholic Archdiocese of Denver
Religious leaders from Colorado
Catholics from Colorado